Symphonic Shades - Hülsbeck in Concert is an album featuring a mastered and mixed recording of the concert of the same name, held in Cologne, Germany at the Funkhaus Wallrafplatz on August 23, 2008. It features music composed by German video game composer Chris Hülsbeck, arranged and orchestrated by Jonne Valtonen, Yuzo Koshiro and Takenobu Mitsuyoshi. In addition to live recordings, the album also features new studio recordings of the piano piece Turrican 3, performed by Benyamin Nuss in his first collaborative effort with Merregnon Studios. The concert was also broadcast live on radio, marking the first time a video game concert has been broadcast on air.

The artwork for the album was provided by Hitoshi Ariga, most noted for his work on the Rockman manga series and The Big O.

Versions
The original release was done in a limited quantity of 1000 copies, and sold out from its main retailer MAZ-Audio within a single month. The first print came in a deluxe jewel case, with a premium matte booklet that features photography from the concert taken by Philippe Ramakers and Thomas Böcker personally, as well as extensive liner notes and an interview with Chris Hülsbeck, conducted by Matthias Oborski.

Due to the overwhelming continued demand and interest from fans, a second print was issued on May 29, 2009. This version came with the same content, though now produced with standard jewel casing and booklet paper. As of 2011, both the first and second print of the CD is completely out of print.

To enable continued availability of the album, a digital release is available on iTunes and Amazon.

Track listing

All tracks composed by Chris Hülsbeck, Arranged and orchestrated by Jonne Valtonen.

Reception
Much like the concert, the album was met with universal praise from the critical community and the fans. Chris Greening of Square Enix Music Online stated "Symphonic Shades - Hülsbeck in Concert is the best orchestral game music album ever created" and "Simply a perfect production all round." before awarding the album 10 out of 10 points. Tim Sheehy of Original Sound Version proclaimed Symphonic Shades "gives us a full CD of beautiful orchestrations which are arranged so well that you’ll enjoy them even if you’ve never played any of the games". German journalist Thomas Nickel gave high praise to the CD as well, stating "The album is not only a treat for hardcore fans,[...] it shows how far the medium of game music has gotten."

References

External links
Symphonic Shades
MAZ Sound Tools
Chris Hülsbeck Productions
Personal website of Thomas Böcker
VGMdb Entry

2008 live albums